Paramount+ is an American subscription video on-demand service owned by Paramount Global. The service's content is drawn primarily from the libraries of CBS Media Ventures (including CBS Studios), Paramount Media Networks (formerly Viacom Media Networks and ViacomCBS Domestic Media Networks), and Paramount Pictures, while also including original series and films, live streaming sports coverage, and in the U.S., live streaming of local CBS broadcast stations.

The service was first launched in the United States on October 28, 2014, as CBS All Access; the service initially focused on the live streaming of CBS programming from its local affiliates, as well as on-demand access to CBS programs and library content. The service began to expand into original programming in 2016, beginning with spin-offs of CBS programs such as Big Brother, The Good Fight, and the new Star Trek television series Star Trek: Discovery. The service also began to expand into other markets, including Canada and Australia (the latter in conjunction with CBS's recently acquired Network 10).

In November 2019, CBS merged back into Viacom to form ViacomCBS (now Paramount Global); over 2020, plans were announced for content from Viacom Media Networks brands (including Comedy Central, MTV and Nickelodeon, among others) and Paramount Pictures to be integrated into CBS All Access, wider international expansion and a larger slate of original programming, and to eventually relaunch the service to reflect its wider scope. In September 2020, it was officially announced that the service would rebrand as Paramount+ in 2021, taking its name from the Paramount Pictures film studio.

The rebranding took effect on March 4, 2021, concurrent with wider expansion into Latin America, and later Europe. The service is also available in all U.S. territories, except for Puerto Rico. The service was launched in South Korea, as a content hub, on June 16, 2022, and launched in the United Kingdom and Ireland on June 21, 2022—a day earlier than expected—where it is also available on the Amazon Prime Video platform as well as its standalone app. An announcement about the launch of Paramount+ in Italy, France, Germany, Switzerland and Austria in the second half of the year was made in early 2022. Paramount+ has recently announced that the streaming service will be launched in France and French-speaking Switzerland on December 1, followed by its arrival in Germany, Austria and German-speaking Switzerland on December 8.  Paramount+ was replaced in the Nordics by SkyShowtime, a joint venture with Comcast that also includes Sky Studios and NBCUniversal content, which was also be released in most of the rest of Europe over the course of late 2022 and early 2023, excluding territories where Sky operates as a pay TV provider and France.

History

As CBS All Access 

CBS All Access was launched on October 28, 2014, priced at US$5.99 per month with advertising and $9.99 per month without. Announced on October 16, 2014, as the first over-the-top (OTT) offering by an American broadcast television network, the service initially encompassed the network's existing streaming portal at CBS.com and its mobile app for smartphones and tablet computers; CBS All Access became available on Roku on April 7, 2015, and on Chromecast on May 14, 2015. In addition to providing full-length episodes of past and present of CBS programs, the service allows live programming streams of local CBS affiliates in 194 markets reaching 92% of the United States (including stations owned by Sinclair Broadcast Group, Hearst Television, Tegna Media, Nexstar Media Group, Meredith Corporation, Griffin Media, Gray Television, Weigel Broadcasting and Cox Media Group and the launch group of CBS Television Stations), including SEC sports and the NFL; however due to the absence of streaming rights, a few sports events are not streamed on the service (mainly involving PGA Tour events, some locally programmed NFL preseason games, and select brokered shows through CBS Sports Spectacular), along with limited syndicated and paid programming where only a local broadcast license to carry the program is allowed and web airing rights are retained by the syndicator or infomercial producer. By the very nature of its being live, streaming of a local affiliate does include all advertising, even with the commercial-free plan.

On December 1, 2016, CBS announced an agreement with the NFL to allow clearance of regional NFL games carried by CBS on CBS All Access from Week 13 of the 2016 NFL season on. At the time, the games were blacked out on non–Verizon Wireless mobile devices due to that provider's exclusivity agreement as the official wireless sponsor of the league. In the 2018 NFL season, a new agreement with Verizon ending that exclusivity began to allow CBS All Access to stream games to all mobile devices; Super Bowl games run on CBS All Access without the need for any authentication.

 the service had nearly 1.5 million subscribers. In August of the same year, CBS unveiled plans to expand CBS All Access to markets outside the United States. Canada was announced as the first international market to receive the service. Plans to launch in Australia quickly followed, resulting from CBS's purchase of free-to-air broadcaster Network 10.

In September 2017, Star Trek: Discovery premiered on CBS All Access, with its first episode also airing on the CBS broadcast network to promote the service. CBS reported that the premiere had driven its largest single-day increase in new subscribers since the Grammy Awards. Along with Star Trek, Big Brother 19 and the start of the 2017 NFL season had also driven major increases in growth that month.

Buoyed by Star Trek: Discovery, CBS All Access reached over 2 million subscribers by early 2018. The 60th Annual Grammy Awards also provided a boost to sign-ups, marking the second largest day for new subscriptions after the Discovery premiere. In April 2018, CBS All Access was made available outside the United States for the first time when it was launched in Canada.

The service launched in Australia in December 2018 as 10 All Access. It operated alongside 10's free catch up and live streaming service 10 Play and contains a mixture of Network 10 and CBS programming. CBS shows are made available on All Access prior to being broadcast on 10's channels. 10 All Access is commercial-free and, unlike CBS All Access, has only one pricing tier.

In January 2019, CBS reported its largest increase in subscribers over a weekend—a 72% increase over the premiere of Discovery, crediting the premiere of season 2 of the series and that week's AFC Championship Game (which also brought the service its largest streaming audience for a football game). Super Bowl LIII would surpass this record only a few weeks later, with CBS reporting an 84% increase in new subscribers.

Re-merger of CBS and Viacom 
On November 25, 2019, as part of the re-merger between CBS Corporation and Viacom, CBS All Access announced the inclusion of programming from Nickelodeon, as part of the wider launch of children's programming on the service, with other partners including Boat Rocker Studios and WildBrain.

In January 2020, CBS All Access became available on the Xfinity Flex platform, followed by the X1 platform in December.

On February 6, 2020, CNBC reported that ViacomCBS was in discussions to launch a larger premium streaming offering, combining CBS All Access with content from Paramount Pictures, the Domestic Media Networks division, and Pluto TV. The service would include an ad-free tier, and a premium tier that includes Showtime's streaming service. The company would maintain its existing streaming platforms, while marketing the new service to users of these other services. ViacomCBS partially outlined these plans in a corporate earnings call on February 20, 2020, stating that the expanded All Access service would take a "house of brands" approach to content and serve as a mid-tier offering complementing Pluto TV (which would remain a free service) and the Showtime OTT service by "adding a broad pay offering, built on All Access's foundation." The expanded service will include content from MTV, VH1, Nickelodeon, Comedy Central, BET, and Smithsonian Channel, as well as a library of 30,000 television series episodes and up to 1,000 film titles from Paramount's film and television divisions and CBS Media Ventures and expanded live news and sports offerings. No pricing plan or firm dates for content expansion were disclosed, though a "soft relaunch" will occur later in 2020. ViacomCBS will also continue to license its TV and film content to competing streaming platforms.

On May 7, 2020, CBS All Access began adding more films to the service, starting with more than 100 from Paramount Pictures, and ViacomCBS announced that CBS All Access will expand internationally within twelve months. On July 30, 2020, CBS All Access added several shows from ViacomCBS Domestic Media Networks, introduced a new user interface with "hubs" for different brands, and revealed that Kamp Koral: SpongeBob's Under Years (previously planned to air on Nickelodeon) would debut on the service in 2021. With the expansion, it was also announced that the service would rebrand in early-2021 to separate itself from CBS's platforms, and that there were plans to add multiple user profiles and parental controls later in 2020.

Rebrand as Paramount+ 
On September 15, 2020, it was announced that CBS All Access would rebrand as Paramount+ in 2021, and that it planned to perform more international expansion under the new name. ViacomCBS CEO Bob Bakish stated Paramount was "an iconic and storied brand beloved by consumers all over the world, and it is synonymous with quality, integrity and world-class storytelling".

On January 19, 2021, it was announced that Paramount+ would launch on March 4, 2021, with information being released on February 24, 2021, during an investor event. The company announced that no updates will be provided for apps on second or third generation Apple TV once the service relaunches. ViacomCBS announced during their investor event on February 24 that Paramount+ would premiere new 2021 theatrical releases from Paramount Pictures (such as A Quiet Place Part II and Snake Eyes) 45 days after their theatrical release,  PAW Patrol: The Movie and Clifford the Big Red Dog received simultaneous theatrical and Paramount+ releases on August 20 and November 10, 2021 respectively, while other future theatrical releases from Paramount would premiere on the service either after their theatrical run or after their run on Epix (which reached a new deal with ViacomCBS that same day to provide content for Paramount+, allowing recent releases from Paramount to be available on the service among other titles).

The relaunch occurred as announced on March 4, 2021, with additional streaming content being launched and further rebranding efforts taking place at that time. In August 2021, it was announced that Paramount+ would be shut down in Nordic Europe in 2022 in favor of SkyShowtime, a joint venture with Comcast-owned Sky Group that would also include content from Showtime, Sky Studios, and NBCUniversal.

In September 2021, it was announced that Showtime's direct-to-consumer service would be offered as part of a bundle with Paramount+. Showtime content would still be accessed via the Showtime app and website, but plans were announced for Showtime content to be accessible within the Paramount+ apps for its DTC subscribers later in 2022. The change was implemented in August 2022, with subscribers on both services able to upgrade to the combined "Paramount+ with Showtime" service, and the bundle also available with a discount for new subscribers as an introductory offer.

On August 15, 2022, Walmart reached an exclusive deal with Paramount+ to offer the streaming service as part of its Walmart+ offering. It meant that Walmart+ customers could access the ad-supported plan on Paramount+ at no additional charge. Qantas also announced it had partnered with Paramount ANZ to offer Paramount+ on its in-flight entertainment systems.

On January 30, 2023, it was announced that Paramount+ will formally merge with Showtime in the United States later in the year, with the pay television service to be formally renamed Paramount+ with Showtime to match the name of its associated streaming product.

Subscribers 

In 2021, the company ViacomCBS issued a press release that revealed the combined number of subscribers to both CBS All Access and Showtime (another streaming product). That press release revealed that the two streaming services had a combined 19.2 million US subscribers, though the release did not provide individual numbers for either service. In May 2021, ViacomCBS reported to have gained 6 million subscribers during the first quarter of 2021. This brought the total number of global subscribers for ViacomCBS streaming platforms (Paramount+, Showtime, BET+) to 36 million. Out of the 36 million subscribers, a majority of these subscribers are subscribed to Paramount+; however, the exact number of subscribers were not released.

On February 15, 2022, Paramount announced that 32.8 million subscribers have signed up for Paramount+ as of the end of 2021. This number increased to 39.6 million as of the end of March 2022 and reached to 43.4 million by September 2022.

Programming

Original programming 

On November 2, 2015, it was announced that CBS All Access would expand into original programming, announcing plans for a new Star Trek television series produced by Alex Kurtzman to premiere in 2017. The series would be the first television series in the franchise since Star Trek: Enterprise (which ran from 2001 to 2005 on former corporate sibling UPN). The series was later announced as Star Trek: Discovery.

On May 18, 2016, it was announced that The Good Wife would get a spin-off featuring Christine Baranski's character Diane Lockhart. The series, titled The Good Fight, launched with a CBS broadcast premiere on February 19, 2017, with the remaining nine episodes exclusive to CBS All Access. The series ultimately became the first original drama on the platform, as the premiere of Star Trek: Discovery had been delayed from a planned launch in May 2017. On August 2, 2016, it was announced that a streaming spin-off season of CBS reality series Big Brother was being planned for CBS All Access. The season, Big Brother: Over the Top, premiered on September 28, 2016.

Further Star Trek television series were announced for CBS All Access as well: in February 2019, CBS All Access announced a series focusing on the Star Trek: The Next Generation character Captain Jean-Luc Picard (with Patrick Stewart reprising his role), to air by the end of the year. The series was later announced as Star Trek: Picard and premiered on January 23, 2020. The adult animation series Star Trek: Lower Decks premiered on August 6, 2020.

With the rebranding of the service as Paramount+, The SpongeBob Movie: Sponge on the Run, and spin-off series Kamp Koral: SpongeBob's Under Years debuted on March 4, 2021. Sponge on the Run was also made available to rent on demand on the same day. ViacomCBS announced planned original series such as the true crime series The Real Criminal Minds, a revival of Behind the Music,  a revival of the BET series The Game, Taylor Sheridan's Lioness, and The Offer—a drama based on Albert S. Ruddy's experiences filming The Godfather. It later announced plans to produce continuations, revivals, and reboots of other properties, including a series adaptation of Flashdance, Frasier, iCarly, Reno 911! , and others.

On February 25, 2021, Paramount+ announced a television adaptation of the Xbox Game Studios franchise Halo produced by Amblin Television and Showtime, set to premiere in 2022. The show had been moved from Showtime's slate, as ViacomCBS positions the network as a premium "adult" service (as opposed to the broader positioning of Paramount+).

In May 2021, CBS announced that Evil and SEAL Team would move from CBS to Paramount+ beginning with their second and fifth seasons respectively.

In August 2021, as part of the renewal of Comedy Central animated series South Park through 2027, it was announced that series creators Trey Parker and Matt Stone would produce 14 movie-length South Park specials for Paramount+, with two premiering per-year from 2021 through 2027. Streaming rights to the South Park series proper are owned by HBO Max through 2025, after which streaming rights for new episodes will move to Paramount+ beginning in 2024 (season 27), and the series library in 2025.

In May 2022, Paramount announced that Paramount+ was planned to commission 150 international originals by 2025, some of them were came from Latin America (mostly Mexico) and European territories (including France, Italy and Spain).

Sports programming 
Paramount+ also carries sports programming, in conjunction with CBS Sports. In November 2019, CBS announced that it had acquired streaming rights in the United States to the UEFA Champions League and Europa League in European soccer, replacing Turner Sports. All matches will stream on the service, with selected matches on the broadcast network and CBS Sports Network. The contract was initially to begin in the 2021–22 season and last through 2023–24. However, during a suspension of the 2019–20 season due to the COVID-19 pandemic in Europe, existing rightsholder Turner Sports opted out of its contract, and CBS took over the rights early for its remaining seasons. On August 19, 2022, UEFA extended the deal until 2030.

The service has picked up other domestic and international soccer events as well, including the National Women's Soccer League (NWSL), CONCACAF Nations League, Women's Nations League, and 2022 CONCACAF Women's Championship, the Argentine Primera División, Brazilian Série A, and Italy's Serie A. As part of the NFL's rights renewal with CBS, Paramount+ gains expanded rights to stream games on both its premium and ad-supported tiers between 2021 and 2033.

Paramount+ has also acquired exclusive rights in Mexico, Central America, Belize and Dominican Republic for the Premier League starting in the 2022/2023 season, and will carry rights in Brazil to air Copa Libertadores and Copa Sudamericana, beginning on the 2023 seasons for their respective football cups.

In June 2022, Viacom 18, a joint venture between Paramount Global and Network 18, acquired the exclusive streaming rights to the IPL Cricket in India for five years. These rights were previously held by Disney+ Hotstar.

Current broadcasting rights

Syndicated and archived programming 
The most recent episodes of CBS's shows are usually made available on CBS.com and Paramount+ the day after their original broadcast.

Paramount+ provides complete back catalogs of most of its current series, including full-season "stacking rights" (with the exception of certain series, such as The Big Bang Theory, which CBS held only "last five" episode rights during its original run, as Warner Bros. retains all other rights as the show's distributor), as well as a wide selection of episodes of classic series from the CBS Media Ventures program library – including shows previously owned by the original Paramount Television made for both CBS and other networks prior to CBS's acquisition of its program library through the CBS-Viacom split (including the complete episode catalog of shows like Star Trek, Cheers, MacGyver, Twin Peaks and CSI: Miami), along with the pre-1973 NBC and ABC libraries to subscribers of the service. Paramount+ also carries behind-the-scenes features from CBS programs and special events, and (beginning with the 17th season in June 2015) live feeds and special content from the reality series Big Brother.

In mid-April 2017, a limited library of films, made up of content from Paramount Pictures, Metro-Goldwyn-Mayer, Sony Pictures, The Samuel Goldwyn Company and CBS Films, was made available on the service. This includes several titles in the Star Trek film series. On May 7, 2020, CBS All Access added more than 100 films from Paramount Pictures; more films were added in the following months.

In August 2019, CBS All Access expanded into children's broadcasting by acquiring the U.S. broadcast rights to Danger Mouse (1981) (as well as the reboot of the series), Cloudy with a Chance of Meatballs, and several other series from WildBrain including Inspector Gadget (and Inspector Gadget's Field Trip), Bob the Builder (original and reboot), Polly Pocket and others. On July 30, 2020, CBS All Access added 56 shows from ViacomCBS Domestic Media Networks.

On February 15, 2022, it was announced that Paramount+ will be the new global streaming home for South Park beginning with season 27 in 2024, after HBO Max's deal to the said show will expire in 2025 in the U.S. and its separate international deal with Netflix will also expire in 2022. This comes just seven months after the show's creators Trey Parker and Matt Stone extending their deals with Paramount Global in August 2021; the streaming acquisition of the series will also include the rights to all 310 episodes beginning in 2022 in other countries and in 2025 in the U.S.

Launch 
CBS All Access was first launched in the United States on October 28, 2014. The service would receive its first International expansion on April 23, 2018, when CBS All Access expanded to Canada. Australia received its own version of the service, named 10 All Access, on December 4, 2018.

In August 2020, ViacomCBS announced plans to launch an expanded international streaming service using the CBS All Access technical architecture, but under the new Paramount+ name (revealed in September) in 2021; the Paramount+ name would also be applied to the American replacement to CBS All Access. The service features original programming from CBS All Access as well as Showtime, plus additional programming including Paramount Pictures films which may vary by market. The service would initially launch in the Nordics and Latin America, replacing an existing service of the same name, with additional markets to follow. In Australia, while the relaunched service will premiere all new Showtime original programs going forward, currently-airing series will remain on Stan until their conclusion under an existing deal.

The Paramount+ brand itself was originated as a subscription video on demand film service, first launching in the Nordics in 2017, and then in Hungary, Latin America, and Russia in the following three years. The current iteration of Paramount+ in the Nordics and Latin America was preceded by this service.

Outside the United States, Paramount+ is currently available in Australia, Canada, Germany, Italy, Latin America, Middle East (as a pay TV channel), Nordics, the United Kingdom and Ireland. Additionally, the Paramount+ SVOD service is still active in Russia (as Okko Paramount+ and IVI Paramount Play), though the current streaming service is unavailable in said regions. Due to program rights and existing content deals, several programs are not available on local versions, or have delayed availability for new episodes. For example, Star Trek: Discovery and all others from the franchise are licensed to Bell Media in Canada for their CTV Sci-Fi (in English) and Z (in French) channels and streaming service Crave. As another example, selected Paramount+ original kids and family programming such as Kamp Koral: SpongeBob's Under Years and Rugrats are licensed to Corus Entertainment for their YTV and Treehouse networks and Nick+ streaming service in 2021, in part due to pre-existing agreements between Corus and Paramount Global. Star Trek: Prodigy is currently the only show of the genre not to be available on either Corus services or Paramount+. Instead, it airs in Canada on the CTV Sci-Fi Channel.

A localized version of Paramount+ operates in the Middle East as a premium offering on pay-TV provider OSN, replacing the now-defunct Paramount Channel. It features content from the aforementioned channel, as well as Nickelodeon, Comedy Central and MTV.

In India, Paramount+ original programming, along with Showtime and CBS programming were made available under Voot Select in Viacom18's Voot, a joint venture between Paramount Global and Network 18, beginning in early 2021.

In August 2021, Comcast announced an agreement with Paramount Global to launch SkyShowtime, a joint streaming service combining programming from the Paramount Global, Sky, and NBCUniversal libraries as well as original programming from Peacock and Paramount+. The service is expected to be available in 20 smaller European territories, including four Nordic countries along with Hungary where it will replace Paramount+, instead of Paramount+ and Peacock operating separately in those markets.

In November 2021, it was announced that Star Trek: Discovery would be pulled from Netflix in all countries outside the United States and Canada (for which Bell Media retained the license for the entire Star Trek libraries) and moved to Paramount+ for international release. Also reported were plans for its 2022 global rollout, starting with its launch in the United Kingdom, Ireland, Italy, Germany, German-speaking Switzerland and Austria via Sky Group and South Korean entertainment and media conglomerate CJ ENM to launch Paramount+ as a content hub on TVING (similar to Disney+'s Star), marking the first Asian region to launch the streaming platform; the partnership also includes a joint venture for future content, including English adaptations of tvN drama series which has produced by CJ's production house Studio Dragon. During the earning call on May 3, 2022, Paramount+ was set to be launched in the United Kingdom and Ireland on June 22, 2022, while the South Korean content hub launch was on June 16, 2022. Paramount also announced that Paramount+ would launch in India from Viacom18 in 2023. It is yet to be announced on whether it will replace Voot.

On February 15, 2022, during its annual investor presentation, French media conglomerate and cable operator Canal+ Group announced that Paramount+ will be launching in France in December of that year, followed by the announcement that the streamer will also expand into the Caribbean also due in the end of the year, and in Southeast Asia, Taiwan, Hong Kong, Africa, and the MENA in 2023.

On March 28, 2022, Caribbean cable operators FLOW and BTC announced that Paramount+ will be launching in the Caribbean via the cable companies' video on demand platforms.

On November 27, 2022, the director of the Swiss branch of Canal+ Group announced that Paramount+ will be launching in French-speaking Switzerland on December 1, 2022.

Meanwhile Paramount+ was released in other territories in Europe as SkyShowtime, beginning with replacing Paramount+ in the Nordics in September 20, 2022, launching in October 25 of same year, in the Netherlands and Portugal, afterwards in the former Yugoslav countries (Except North Macedonia) on December 14 of that same year, and on February 14, 2023, in the rest of Central and Eastern Europe. SkyShowtime finished its expansion by releasing in Spain and Andorra on February 28, 2023.

See also 
 BET+
 Nick+
 FuboTV
 My5
 Noggin
 Philo
 Pluto TV
 Voot
 List of streaming media services

Notes

References

External links 
 

Paramount+
2014 establishments in New York City
2021 establishments in New York City
Internet properties established in 2014
Internet properties established in 2021
Internet television channels
Internet television streaming services
Subscription video on demand services
Paramount Streaming
Paramount Pictures
PlayStation 4 software
PlayStation 5 software
IOS software
Xbox Series X and Series S software
Android (operating system) software